Change We Must is the seventh solo album by Yes lead singer Jon Anderson, released in 1994. The album contains new material and orchestral arrangements of songs from Anderson's past.

Track listing

"State of Independence": original version on the Jon & Vangelis album The Friends of Mr Cairo (1981).
"Hearts": original version on the Yes album 90125 (1983).
"Hurry Home" and "Under the Sun": original versions on In the City of Angels (1988), the latter as "It's on Fire".
"Candle Song" (as "Anyone Can Light a Candle"): original version on the Jon & Vangelis album Page of Life (1991).
"Change We Must": later added to the alternate US release of Page of Life (1998).

Personnel 
Jon Anderson - vocals and orchestrations
Matt Clifford - keyboards, orchestration (7, 9)
Opio Singers Choir (1-3, 10, 12)
Nick Ingram - orchestration (1, 4, 12)
Ian Thomas - drums (3)
Milton McDonald - guitar (3, 12)
Steve Pearce - bass (3, 11, 12)
Toby Alington - synths (3)
Gwendolyn Mok - piano (4, 7, 9)
Geoffrey Alexander - orchestration (5, 6, 8, 10, 11)
Sandrine Piau - vocals (6)
Tim Handley - orchestration (7)
Jade Anderson - vocals (8)
Christopher Warren-Green, Rosie Furness, Roger Chase, Steve Trees, Jonathan Williams - String Quartet (8)
Skaila Kanga - harp (8)
Nadya - Sun Chant (11)

References

External links 
 

1994 albums
Jon Anderson albums